The South Bend Common Council is the City of South Bend's legislative branch. It consists of nine council members, six representing a district of the city, and additional more at-large councilpersons.

History 
The Common Council was initiated by the incorporation of the City of South Bend on May 22, 1865. The first members were elected to the council on June 5 that same year. The council currently meets in the County-City Building, a fifteen-story building in the heart of downtown. The building houses City and County offices. For the much past several decades, the Democrats have had a majority on the council. This is partially due to South Bend's diverse and urbanized population which has traditionally favored modern liberalism.

Procedure 
Per Indiana state law, the council may pass resolutions and ordinances. Resolutions relate to internal council procedures, while ordinances address municipal codes. If a bill is approved, it is sent to the mayor (James Mueller) to be signed into law. They mayor can veto, but a six-vote majority can override this action.

Current council 
The Common Council currently has a 8-1 Democratic majority. There is also, as of 2021, a 5-4 female preponderance. Councilpersons serve four-year terms. Karen White, a member of the council since 1999, serves as its president.

Committees 
The council has multiple committees including;

Community Investment
Community Relations
Council Rules
Health and Public Safety
Information and Technology
PARC (Parks, Recreation, Cultural Arts, & Entertainment)
Personnel Finance
Public Works and Property Vacation
Residential Neighborhoods
Utilities
Zoning and Annexation

Upcoming elections 
None of the current council members have publicly announced plans to resign and most are in preparation for their next election. Republican Eli Wax, who represents the city's most rural and southernmost district is the only councilperson to face a Democratic challenger.

2021 investigations 
In early 2021, the St. Joseph County Democratic Party Chairman at the time, Steve Wruble, requested that Mayor James Mueller investigate two council members (Shelia Niezgodski and Canneth Lee) for non-city related income. His March 1 letter to the mayor asked the city to probe Niezgodski and Lee for alleged violation of city law. The letter (which was publicly released on March 5) also cited voter mistrust within the local Democratic Party, of which all the aforementioned politicians are affiliated with. Wruble wrote: “even a perceived conflict of interest can leave serious political fallout and lead to voter mistrust.” Mueller, a critic of Wruble, delivered a message that highlighted the fact that the private sector jobs of Lee and Niezgodski were well known before the two were elected, and that city attorneys had previously reviewed those jobs for any ethics violations.

References

External links
 Common Council

Government of South Bend, Indiana
Indiana city councils